Wade Hampton High School is a public high school within Hampton County School District 1, located between the towns of Hampton and Varnville, South Carolina, United States.  The high school serves students in those communities in addition to students living in rural areas of northern and eastern Hampton County.  The school served 719 students in the 2011–2012 school year.  Wade Hampton Highschool is currently in the process  of merging with nearby Estil high school.  As off January 2023,  the school is planning to rename to Hampton County High School.  The merger is expected to take place in fall, 2023. 

The school is named for Confederate general and "Redeemer" governor Wade Hampton.

Academics

In 2012, the average student-teacher ratio in core subjects was 24.9 students for every 1 teacher. Wade Hampton High School is accredited with the Southern Association of Colleges and Schools (SACS).

Athletics
Wade Hampton competes at the Class AAA level in the South Carolina High School League.  The school fields teams for boys in football, basketball, cross country, track & field, tennis, and golf; and for girls in cheerleading, volleyball, basketball, cross country, track & field, tennis, and golf.  Wade Hampton has historic Class AA rivalries with Bamberg-Earhardt High School, Silver Bluff High School, and Barnwell High School. The school's main proximity rivalries are with Estill High School and Allendale-Fairfax High School, both of which compete in Class A and AA respectively. Starting in the 2016–2017 academic year, the school moved up to Class AAA in all sports.

See also
Hampton County, South Carolina

References

External links
 School website
 2012 school report card by S.C. Department of Education

Education in Hampton County, South Carolina
Public high schools in South Carolina